Wan Rizal bin Wan Zakariah (born 1978) is a Singaporean politician and sport science lecturer. A member of the governing People's Action Party (PAP), he has been the Member of Parliament (MP) representing the Kolam Ayer division of Jalan Besar GRC since 2020.

Education
During Rizal's secondary school education, he was under the Normal (Academic) stream. 

He subsequently went on to complete a diploma in electronics at Temasek Polytechnic in 1999, before graduating with a Bachelor of Science with second upper honours degree in physical education from the Nanyang Technological University in 2009.

He subsequently went on to obtained a PhD in physical education from the Nanyang Technological University in 2017.

Career
Rizal served his National Service in the Singapore Civil Defence Force (SCDF) between 1999 and 2003, and attained the rank Lieutenant.

After completing his National Service, he went on to complete a diploma with merit in physical education at the National Institute of Education before working as a physical education teacher at Ngee Ann Primary School and Hougang Primary School between 2005 and 2012.

He was a part-time physical education and sports science lecturer at the National Institute of Education, and an associate lecturer at Republic Polytechnic's School of Sports, Health and Leisure between 2014 and 2015. In 2016, he became a senior lecturer at Republic Polytechnic.

Rizal was the chairman of the Al-Islah Mosque in Punggol between 2011 and 2016, canvassing for donations and overseeing the construction of the new mosque.

Politics
Rizal has been involved in political activities with the governing People's Action Party (PAP) since 2018, after having helped out Member of Parliament Zainal Sapari at his Meet-the-People Sessions for a year in 2017. 

He made his political debut in the 2020 general election as part of a four-member PAP team contesting in Jalan Besar GRC and the team won 65.37% of the vote. 

Rizal was later appointed as the chairman of the Jalan Besar Town Council.

Personal life
Rizal is married with four children.

References

External links
 Wan Rizal Wan Zakariah on Parliament of Singapore

Living people
1978 births
People's Action Party politicians
Members of the Parliament of Singapore
Singaporean Muslims
Singaporean people of Malay descent